Hermanus van Brussel, a landscape painter and etcher, was born at Haarlem in 1763, and died at Utrecht in 1815. Among his best etchings is
mentioned a set of twenty-one landscapes with figures.

Biography
According to the RKD he was a pupil of Johan Bernhard Brandhof, Christiaan Henning and Wybrand Hendriks. He later became the teacher of Woutherus Mol.

He was known for his set designs for the Amsterdam Theatre and Het Loo Palace. In Haarlem he was a member of the amateur playhouse society "Kunstliefde" and made many set designs for them.  Like many Dutch painters of his time, his works paid great attention to the skies as the land was often relatively featureless.

Note

References
 Hermanus van Brussel on Artnet
Hermanus van Brussel (1763-1815) : biografie en catalogus van zijn prentwerk, by Bert Sliggers, 1999, Issue 20 of Delineavit et sculpsit
Attribution:
 
 Hermanus van Brussel, by The British Museum

1763 births
1815 deaths
18th-century Dutch painters
18th-century Dutch male artists
Dutch male painters
Artists from Haarlem
Dutch engravers
Dutch landscape painters
Landscape artists